Shawnee Mission District Stadium is a multi-purpose sport stadium located in Overland Park, Kansas.  The facility is primarily used by Shawnee Mission North High School, Shawnee Mission Northwest High School and Shawnee Mission East High School. In the 2013 season of the National Women's Soccer League, the stadium served as the home field for FC Kansas City. Sporting Kansas City, then called the Kansas City Wizards, played at the stadium in a match against the Colorado Rapids during the 2008 Lamar Hunt U.S. Open Cup.

The stadium is one of two in the Shawnee Mission School District. The other is at Shawnee Mission South High School.

Stadium
After demolition of the stadium originally built in the 1950s, the current stadium was built in 2005. The turf was refinished in 2006. The stadium features a 6,150 seating capacity, multi-use artificial surface with a track around it, and seating on each sideline.

In February 2013, team president, Bud Budzinski, announced that the stadium would be the home field for the FC Kansas City for the inaugural season of the National Women's Soccer League, a new professional women's soccer league in the United States. It is the third largest stadium in the NWSL after Jeld-Wen Field in Portland, Oregon, home of the Portland Thorns and Sahlen's Stadium in Rochester, New York, home of the Western New York Flash.

The field was known as Verizon Wireless Field for FC Kansas City games in 2013 due to a partnership with Verizon Wireless.

See also
 Shawnee Mission North High School
 Shawnee Mission Northwest High School
 FC Kansas City

References

External links
 FC Kansas City Venue

Former National Women's Soccer League stadiums
Sports venues in Kansas
Soccer venues in Kansas
Buildings and structures in Kansas City, Kansas
High school football venues in the United States
American football venues in Kansas
2005 establishments in Kansas
Sports venues completed in 2005